Bailey's Taproom was a beer bar in downtown Portland, Oregon, in the United States. Established by owner Geoff Phillips in 2007, the business was a popular destination for craft beer tourism and garnered a positive reception. Bailey's closed in 2021 during the COVID-19 pandemic. The bar had a second-floor sibling establishment called The Upper Lip (also known as Bailey's Upper Lip), which also closed in 2021.

Description 
Bailey's Taproom was a beer bar in Southwest Portland's Trident building. Frommer's said the "casual" establishment had large windows and prioritized Oregon beers. The space had a "handsome", minimalist decor and hosted board games, darts, and regular events. In her 2011 book Cheap Bastard's Guide to Portland, Oregon, Rachel Dresbeck said the open space had an "industrial-chic feel" and allowed "cheap and interesting" dates. The bar offered 24 rotating taps and growler fills, and allowed food to be ordered from nearby eateries.

History
The bar opened in downtown Portland in 2007. Owner Geoff Phillips drove to craft breweries in search of unique kegs to bring back to the bar. The formula proved popular with locals, as well as tourists. The magazine GQ noted that it had a keg-tracking system that "ensure[d] you never get the dregs of the Northwest's best hops bombs." Although Bailey's emphasis was on local and Oregon beers, the taproom also served a few rare and unusual beers from California and Washington. The business installed a beer engine in 2008.

Bailey's began hosting CellarFest in 2010. The bar hosted a yearly Belgium-themed event called Belgianfest, and used the 2016 event "to launch the first of its Hausbier releases, a year-round series which begins with a Belgian lager from The Commons". In 2017, Bailey's hosted the New Oregon Breweries Showcase featuring eleven new breweries from across Oregon. The bar also hosted Killer Beer Fest, the final event of  Brewpublic's 9th Annual Killer Beer Week, held at various locations in the area.

During the COVID-19 pandemic, Bailey's operated in Ankeny Square and via delivery. Attributing the closures in part to the pandemic, Phillips announced the closure of Bailey's and sibling bar The Upper Lip in February 2021. Bailey's had closed indefinitely in September. Christopher Bjorke of the Portland Business Journal called the business a "victim" and wrote, "The popular pub known for the excellence of its beer selection could not survive the extended closure in a downtown area turned desolate by the pandemic." Phillips sold the building, and reused some of the bar furniture when he opened another bar later in 2021, named Level 3.

Reception 

Julian Smith of Frommer's rated Bailey's one out of three stars and said the bar's "constantly changing taps with an amazing range of brews helps rank this place above most Portland beer bars". Portland Monthly said the bar was staffed with a "chipper cast of beer nerds" who could offer helpful suggestions; the magazine recommended the five-beer sampler tray and included Bailey's in a 2017 list of 20 "essential" Portland bars. Michael Russell included both Bailey's and The Upper Lip in The Oregonian 2014 and 2016 lists of the city's 10 best beer bars and 21 "essential" bars, respectively. In his 2015 book The Best Beer in the World, Mark Dredge described Bailey's as "modern and cool" with a "superb" beer list. Nathan Isaacs included Bailey's in U.S. News & World Report 2017 list of seven "great" bars in Portland and said the bar "aims to cater to beer connoisseurs as well as uninitiated beer drinkers".

The Willamette Week named Bailey's one of the best bars in Portland on several occasions. The business was a runner-up in the Best Beer Selection on Tap category in the newspaper's annual readers' poll. Willamette Week included Bailey's in a 2017 list of the "best Portland bars for hardcore beer geeks", citing it as downtown Portland's most popular establishment of its type. Martin Cizmar of the same outlet called the bar "vaunted", and Matthew Korfhage included Bailey's in a 2018 list of "the 10 best and most iconic" beer bars in Oregon.

Thrillist described the bar as a "well-worn PDX favorite". The website's Alexander Frane included Bailey's in a 2017 list of the city's best beer bars and wrote, "It's cramped and busy, especially on weekends, but Bailey's is the best beer bar downtown, with great beers and excellent service." Pete Cottell included Bailey's in Thrillist's 2018 "beer drinker's ultimate guide to Portland" and wrote, "you simply won’t find a bigger or better list of beers that are guaranteed to surprise even the most hardened beer snob." Frane also included Bailey's Taproom and the Upper Lip in Eater Portland 2019 list of 13 "stellar beer bars to hit in Portland". In 2022, Janey Wong of Eater Portland called Bailey's "one of the city's best beer bars". In 2020, Andy Giegerich of the Portland Business Journal called Bailey's a "Portland craft beer mecca" and said the bar was "known for its customer service, which included early adoption of the DigitalPour board".

See also

 Brewing in Oregon
 Impact of the COVID-19 pandemic on the restaurant industry in the United States
 List of defunct restaurants of the United States

Notes

References

External links

 Bailey's Taproom at Untappd
 Bailey's Taproom at Zomato

2007 establishments in Oregon
2021 disestablishments in Oregon
Beer in Oregon
Defunct drinking establishments in Oregon
Defunct restaurants in Portland, Oregon
Restaurants disestablished during the COVID-19 pandemic
Restaurants disestablished in 2021
Restaurants established in 2007
Southwest Portland, Oregon